KDRB (100.3 MHz "100.3 The Bus") is a commercial FM radio station in Des Moines, Iowa. It airs an adult hits radio format and is owned by iHeartMedia. Its slogan is "We Play Everything."  KDRB is the flagship station for Iowa State University sports.

The station's studios are located at 2141 Grand Avenue in Des Moines along with iHeartMedia's other Des Moines stations, and its transmitter is located on Northwest 2nd Street, near Ankeny Boulevard in Alleman.  KDRB broadcasts in the HD Radio format.  Its HD-2 subchannel airs a simulcast of sister station WHO.

History

WHO-FM
In 1948, the station signed on as WHO-FM. It was owned by the Central Broadcasting Company and was the third FM station in Des Moines, after KRNT-FM and KSO-FM.  In its early years, it primarily simulcast its sister station, AM 1040 WHO. During the "Golden Age of Radio," WHO-AM-FM carried programming from the NBC Red Network, including comedies, dramas, news, sports, soap operas, game shows and big band broadcasts.

Studios were located at 1100 Walnut Street and the station's tower and transmitter were located on top of the Equitable Building at 6th and Locust in Des Moines.  In 1950, the transmitter was moved to a new tower at WHO's transmitter site in Mitchellville, Iowa. The old transmitter and tower on top of the Equitable Building were sold to KCBC for a new FM station KCBC-FM. In the mid-1960s, WHO-FM ceased simulcasting its AM sister and started programming easy listening and classical music.

Switch to KLYF
In 1973, the station underwent some dramatic changes. The call letters were changed to KLYF and the station was reprogrammed with a beautiful music format in FM stereo. This was the first time that the station broadcast in multiplex stereo and became known by its nickname "K-Life."  As the 1980s approached, KLYF added more vocals to its sound to attract younger listeners.  In 1981, the format evolved into a soft adult contemporary format.

By the mid 1990s, KLYF was a Hot AC station competing directly with KSTZ.  The station's transmitter was eventually moved to the WOI Tower near Alleman, Iowa.

Ownership changes
In December 1996, Palmer Broadcasting sold its Des Moines radio stations to Jacor Broadcasting of Cincinnati, Ohio.  Jacor immediately re-branded KLYF as "Mix 100.3," but left the format unchanged for the most part.  On June 17, 1998, the call letters changed to KMXD to represent Mix and Des Moines.  Over time the station saw its ratings decline.

Several steps were taken to try to counteract this, such as rebranding the station as "Mix 100" and trying an "80s and more" format. When these steps failed, the format was changed again to mainstream adult contemporary and the station was renamed "My 100."  In 1999, Clear Channel Communications (the forerunner to current owner iHeartMedia) bought Jacor, bringing KLYF under its ownership.

The Bus
On May 25, 2006, the AC format came to an end, as KMXD was rebranded as "The Bus," simulcasting the adult hits format on 106.3, which at the time carried the KDRB call sign. This was a short lived, transitional arrangement to get listeners of 106.3 to move to 100.3.  The adult hits format had performed better than expected, and the decision was made to move "The Bus" to the 100,000 watt signal at 100.3.

On June 12, 2006, KMXD became KDRB "The Bus" on 100.3 FM. The 106.3 frequency switched to AAA as KPTL, "Capital 106.3".

Since the switch to the new format, KDRB has constantly been at the top of the Nielsen Audio Ratings for the Central Iowa area.

Programming
100.3 The Bus primarily has no DJs, except Heather Burnside in middays and Maxwell in afternoon drive.  However, most of the time, the "Bus Driver" is heard between most songs and commercial breaks, mainly to identify the station.  The voice of the "Bus Driver" is national voiceover artist Mark Driscoll.

KDRB has been the flagship station for the Iowa State University Cyclones sports teams since the 2006-2007 season, taking over from sister station AM 1460 KXNO.  Its longtime AM sister, WHO, airs the games of the rival University of Iowa.

Signal
KDRB has an effective radiated power of 100,000 watts, the maximum output for non-grandfathered FM stations.  It broadcasts from a height above average terrain (HAAT) of 547 meters (1795 feet).  That gives it one of the best FM signals in Iowa, allowing it to be heard over much of the state.  With a good radio, it can sometimes be heard in small sections of Kansas, Illinois and Nebraska.  Co-owned AM 1040 WHO also has the largest coverage area of any AM station in the state of Iowa. With a good radio at night, WHO AM can be heard as far away as northern Mexico.

References

External links
The Bus' website
100.3 the Bus at VarietyHits.com

DRB
Radio stations established in 1948
1948 establishments in Iowa
IHeartMedia radio stations
Adult hits radio stations in the United States